Krystian Bondzior (born 24 April 1999) is a Polish handball player for NMC Górnik Zabrze and the Polish national team.

He represented Poland at the 2020 European Men's Handball Championship.

References

External links

1999 births
Living people
People from Lubin
Sportspeople from Lower Silesian Voivodeship
Polish male handball players
21st-century Polish people